The Rokietnica–Skwierzyna railway is a former Polish 92-kilometre long railway line, that connected Poznań with Rokietnica, Międzychód and further to Skwierzyna and Gorzów Wielkopolski.

Opening
The line was opened in three stages:

 1887: Międzychód - Wierzbno
 1888: Rokietnica - Międzychód
 1906: Wierzbno - Skwierzyna

Closure
In 1995, passenger traffic was suspended on the route Międzychód - Skwierzyna. In October 1999 passenger services also ceased between Rokietnica - Międzychód. In 2002, the route was closed to freight traffic Rokietnica - Międzychód. The line became impassable and in 2006 was removed from the register of PKP PLK.

In November 2015 it was announced that the 63 kilometre stretch of line between Międzychód - Rokietnica would be dismantled.

Usage
The line was used by passenger trains between Międzychód - Skwierzyna and Rokietnica - Międzychód. Freight services also used the line.

Gallery

See also 
 Railway lines of Poland

References

 This article is based upon a translation of the Polish language version as of November 2016.

External links 

Railway lines in Poland
Railway lines opened in 1887